Shandong Agricultural University (SDAU), established in 1906, is a comprehensive university in Shandong, China. Several academicians from the Chinese Academy of Sciences and the Chinese Academy of Engineering are graduates from SDAU.

Overview 
SDAU covers an area of more than 5,300 mu (about 353 ha). SDAU has set up 19 institutes. The Chinese geneticist Li Zhensheng was a graduate in this university.

History 
SDAU was established in 1906 in Jinan and was called Shandong Higher Agricultural School. Later, the university changed its name to Shandong Agriculture College in 1952. In 1958, SDAU was moved to Tai'an and in 1983 SDAU got its name.

References

External links 
Shandong Agricultural University

 
Universities and colleges in Shandong
Educational institutions established in 1952
1952 establishments in China